Evgenia Viktorovna Soboleva (born 26 August 1988) is a Russian water polo player. At the 2008 Summer Olympics and 2012 Summer Olympics, she competed for the Russia women's national water polo team in the women's event. She also competed at 2016 Women's European Water Polo Championship

See also
 Russia women's Olympic water polo team records and statistics
 List of Olympic medalists in water polo (women)
 List of players who have appeared in multiple women's Olympic water polo tournaments
 List of World Aquatics Championships medalists in water polo

References

External links
 

1988 births
Living people
Russian female water polo players
Olympic water polo players of Russia
Water polo players at the 2008 Summer Olympics
Water polo players at the 2012 Summer Olympics
World Aquatics Championships medalists in water polo
Water polo players at the 2016 Summer Olympics
Olympic bronze medalists for Russia
Olympic medalists in water polo
Medalists at the 2016 Summer Olympics
Water polo players at the 2020 Summer Olympics
People from Kirishi
Sportspeople from Leningrad Oblast
21st-century Russian women